Battle Cross is a shoot 'em up released in arcades by Omori Electric (also known as Omori Electronic) in 1982. The player controls a fighter spacecraft by moving around the screen and shooting enemies. In 1984 Sony published a version for the Sony Hit-Bit 75 MSX computer.

Gameplay

References

External links

1982 video games
Arcade video games
Shoot 'em ups
MSX games
Multiplayer and single-player video games
Video games developed in Japan